Jean-Pierre Pranlas-Descours (born 1956) is a French architect and urban planner associated with a minimalist aesthetic.

Biography 
Pranlas-Descours received his undergraduate education from the Ecole D’Architecture de Versailles and a Masters in Medieval History from the Ecole des Hautes Etudes en Sciences Sociales, Paris, expanding his exploration in the architectural complex societies of the Medieval cities in Italy. Immediately upon completion, he launched his firm, Pranlas-Descours Architect & Associates (1990 to present) and began teaching at the Ecole D’Architecture de Strasbourg, the Ecole Nationale des Ponts et Chaussée, the Ecole D’Architecture de Rennes, Paris-Tolbiac, Ecole Nationale D’Architecture de Paris-La-Villette, and is presently, a professor at the Ecole D’Architecture Paris-Malaquais. His guest-lecturing has taken him to architectural schools in France, Italy, Spain, the Netherlands, Iceland, Germany, Singapore, Brazil, Peru as well as the United States: Cornell University, Columbia University, and Parson's School of Design.

Honors and awards 
In 1986, Pranlas-Descours received the Rome Prize in Architecture from L’Academie de France in Rome. To further his research, the following year he was honored with a residency at the academy's campus, Villa Medici. He was nominated for the Equerre d’Argent Architectural Prize of the AMC Review, 2000, 2003, 2006. In 2004, Pranlas-Descours’ project for the new center of Saint-Jacques-de-La-lande was shortlisted for the European Urban Prize. For his Bottière Chenaie Urban Design, Nantes, he was the recipient for the distinguished Robert Auzelle Prize. In 2012 Pranlas-Descours received the Honor Medaille from L’Academie D’Architecture de France.

Selected projects 

 International urban competition in Barcelona for the extension of the Diagonal avenue (1990) First prize
 Media Library, Rennes (2000)
 Cemetery Pavilion in Saint-Jacques-de-la-Lande (2007)
 Housing projects: Paris (2003 and 2006), Montreuil (2007 and 2008), Pantin (2013), Clamart (2015), Grenoble (2015)
 International Urban Competition for the extension of downtown Reykjavik (2008) First Prize
 International Urban Competition for the extension of the city El Prat de Llobregat, Barcelona (2009) First Prize
 Technical school in Nantes (2010)
 Hotel-restaurant in Sag Harbor, Long Island, New York (2013)
 Office building in Lille (2014)
 Urban projects in Lille, Nantes, Rennes, Paris, Geneva, Nice, Bordeaux (1992-2014)
 Guild Association building in Lille (2009-2017)
 Parking lot Lille (2014)
 Hospital in Nantes (2014) Competition
 Mixed building—parking lot, sports facility, and offices in Lille (2015-2017)
 Exhibitions of Pranlas-Descours, Architecture Situations: Gallery of Architecture, Paris (2011); Aedes Gallery, Berlin (2012); Burgau Architectural Center, Ulm (2012-2013).

Publications 
 5 projects (French Academy in Rome, Villa Médicis, 1990)
 European Panorama Capitols  (Picard, 2000)
 Metropolitan archipelo, Paris suburb (Picard, 2003)
 Pranlas-Descours, Architecture situations (Ante Prima, 2011)
 Density, Architecture and Territory, 5 European stories (Jovis, Berlin 2016)

References

External links 
  Pranlas-Descours Architect and Associates website 

Pranlas-Descours
Pranlas-Descours
Architects from Paris
1956 births
Living people